Villagra is a surname. Notable people with the surname include:
Carlos Villagra (born 1976), Paraguayan footballer
Cristian Villagra (born 1985), Argentine footballer
Eduardo Villagra (born 1990), Chilean footballer
Federico Villagra (born 1969), Argentine rally driver
Gonzalo Villagra (born 1981), Chilean footballer
José Luis Villagra (born 1986), Argentine footballer
Nelson Villagra (born 1937), Chilean actor, writer and director
Sergio Villagra (born 1973), Australian rules football umpire

See also
de Villagra (disambiguation)
Villagra Point, headland in Antarctica